The Day the Sun Turned Cold is a 1994 Hong Kong drama film directed by Yim Ho. The film was selected as the Hong Kong entry for the Best Foreign Language Film at the 67th Academy Awards, but was not accepted as a nominee. The $HK5 million budget for the film was raised by Yim Ho. It was shot in northeastern China. The film won the Tokyo Grand Prix and Yim Ho won the Best Director award at the Tokyo International Film Festival.

Cast
 Siqin Gaowa as Mother
 Tou Chung-hua as Guan Jian
 Ma Jingwu as Father
 Wei Zi as Lover
 Zhong Shu as Young Son
 Hu Li as Captain

See also
 List of submissions to the 67th Academy Awards for Best Foreign Language Film
 List of Hong Kong submissions for the Academy Award for Best Foreign Language Film

References

External links
 

1994 films
1994 drama films
Hong Kong drama films
1990s Mandarin-language films
Films directed by Yim Ho
1990s Hong Kong films